There are thought to be over half a million undocumented  immigrants residing in New York City. They come from many parts of the world, especially Latin America, Asia, Eastern Europe, and the Caribbean. About 70% of them have paid work, in catering, construction, retail, driving, cleaning, and many other trades; at least in catering, their wages tend to be lower than those of comparable workers.

Profile and demographics 
According to a study by the Fiscal Policy Institute, about 4.08 million immigrants lived in New York State in 2007, and according to the Migration Policy Institute, about 4.47 million immigrants lived in the state in 2014. Of the immigrants in the state, about three million live in New York City. The number of immigrants living in New York City increased only slightly from 2000 to 2011, with an increase from 2,871,032 to 3,066,599 residents being born outside the United States.

A 2007 report by Fiscal Policy Institute estimated there were 535,000 undocumented immigrants in New York City.  In all, undocumented immigrants make up 18 percent of all immigrants living in New York City. Undocumented Immigrants in New York City come from a wide array of countries from all over the globe. According to an estimate by Jeffrey S. Passel of the Pew Hispanic Center, 27 percent of undocumented immigrants in New York City come from Mexico and Central America, 23 percent come from South Asia and East Asia, 22 percent come from the Caribbean, 13 percent come from South America, eight percent come from Europe, five percent come from Africa, and two percent come from the Middle East.

Participation in labor force 
Although undocumented immigrants do not have legal permanent status in the country, locally they have a significant presence in the city's economy and job market. As former New York City Mayor Michael Bloomberg explained, “Although [undocumented aliens] broke the law by illegally crossing our borders or over-staying their visas and our businesses broke the law by employing them, our city’s economy would be a shell of itself had they not, and it would collapse if they were deported”.  According to a Fiscal Policy Institute analysis of 2000 to 2006 data, there are 374,000 undocumented workers in New York City, which makes up 10 percent of the resident workforce. With 374,000 out of 535,000 undocumented workers working in New York City, undocumented aliens have a labor force participation rate of roughly 70 percent.  This percentage is higher than the labor force participation rate for native-born residents, 60 percent, or for overall foreign-born residents, 64 percent, in New York City.

Undocumented workers can be found working in almost every industry in New York City performing a wide variety of tasks.  More than half of all dishwashers in the city are undocumented workers, as are a third of all sewing machine operators, painters, cooks, construction laborers, and food preparation workers. Undocumented workers also make up close to 30 percent of the city's automotive service technicians and mechanics, waiters, maids and housekeeping cleaners, and carpenters. The five occupations with the most undocumented workers in New York City are cooks (21,000), janitors and building cleaners (19,000), construction laborers (17,000), maids and housekeeping cleaners (16,000), and waiters (15,000).

Restaurant industry 
The restaurant industry may be the industry that employs the most undocumented aliens. In 2007, 36 percent of restaurant workers were undocumented aliens.  According to a 2008 estimate from the Pew Hispanic Center, about 20 percent of the nearly 2.6 million chefs, head cooks and cooks in the United States are undocumented aliens.  According to a 2005 report by the Restaurant Opportunities Center of New York and the New York City Restaurant Industry Coalition, undocumented alien workers in the restaurant industry in New York City receive substantially lower wages than legal workers.  According to the report, the median wage of all restaurant workers in the city was $8.00 an hour.  However, when undocumented alien workers’ earnings were taken out of the sample, the median wage rose to $9.00 an hour. A Manhattan chef and restaurateur explained, “We always, always hire the undocumented aliens… It’s not just me, it’s everybody in the industry. First, they are willing to do the work. Second, they are willing to learn. Third, they are not paid as well. It’s an economic decision. It’s less expensive to hire an undocumented person”.

Mexican immigrants 
According to an analysis of the most recently available census data, Mexican immigrants have the highest rate of employment among the city's 10 largest immigrant groups, and they are more likely to hold jobs than New York City's native-born population.  Based on the 2008 census data, about 75 percent of all Mexicans in the city between ages 16 and 65 are in the civilian labor force and only around four percent of them are unemployed, which is well below the nation's current unemployment rate of 9.6%. Experts say the main reason so many of these undocumented aliens are employed is because they are undocumented, and, consequently, they are less likely to report workplace abuses to the authorities for fear of deportation.  As a result, many of these workers hold jobs that pay less than the minimum wage and require them to work 100-hour work weeks.

Social and fiscal impacts

Education 
In 1996, New York City mayor Rudy Giuliani stated: "The reality is that [undocumented aliens] are here, and they're going to remain here. The choice becomes for a city what do you do? Allow them to stay on the streets or allow them to be educated? The preferred choice from the point of view of New York City is to be educated".

Law enforcement 
Although the New York City Police Department (NYPD) does not check immigration status of people seeking medical attention or education services, it does check the immigration status of anyone who commits a crime.

Laws 
In October 1986, Congress passed the Immigration Reform and Control Act (IRCA), which authorized legalization for undocumented immigrants who could prove they had resided in the U.S. continually, although without appropriate documentation, since January 1, 1982.

Mayor Bloomberg explained, “Our general policy in this area protects the confidentiality of law-abiding immigrants, regardless of their status, when they report a crime or visit a hospital or send their children to school”. In New York State, resident undocumented immigrants can get a driver's license. They also pay the same tuition rates as other residents to attend a New York state university or other public university. New York state supports the Deferred Action for Parents of Americans and  Deferred Action for Childhood Arrivals executive actions taken by Barack Obama, which allowed about four million undocumented immigrants to receive work permits and be protected from deportation.

On September 17, 2003, Bloomberg issued Executive Order 41 to protect the privacy of undocumented immigrants and to grant them access to City services that they need and are entitled to receive.  According to Executive Order 41, if an undocumented immigrant goes to a City agency to request certain services or benefits, City employees will not ask about his immigration status unless it is required by law or necessary to determine whether he is eligible to receive those services or benefits.  Furthermore, if an undocumented immigrant is the victim or witness of a crime, or if he calls or approaches the police seeking assistance, police officers will not inquire about his immigration status.

In January 2017, President Donald Trump enacted a new executive order that would allow undocumented immigrants nationwide to be deported on lesser charges than previously.  Over the week of February 6, 2017, six hundred people in 11 states, including 41 people in the New York City area, were arrested by U.S. Immigration and Customs Enforcement. The ICE stated that of those arrested in the New York City area, 95% of those arrested were criminal aliens. Specifically, of the 41 arrested, 38 had at least one criminal conviction. The New York City raids had been planned since January and focused mainly on people who immigrated from Central American countries. The ICE had arrested more undocumented immigrants in the New York metropolitan area in previous raids, including 58 in an August 2016 raid. However, the new ICE raids under Trump's presidency represented an increased enforcement of immigration policy, including detaining and potentially deporting 8 million of the country's estimated 11 million undocumented immigrants. As a result, after the February raids, there were reports of increases in people looking for free legal help from immigrant-rights law firms. The NYPD said that it was not involved in the raids. ICE arrested a further 104 people in the New York area in July 2017.

References

Bibliography
Ciment, James, ed. "New York City." Encyclopedia of American Immigration. Vol. 3. Armonk, NY: M.E Sharpe, 2001.
Krase, Jerome, and Ray Hutchison. Race and Ethnicity in New York City. Vol. 7. Oxford, UK: Elsevier Ltd, 2004.

Further reading
 Tapper, Jake, and Ron Claiborne. "Romney: Giuliani's NYC 'Sanctuary' for undocumented Immigrants." ABCNews.com.
 Passel, Jeffrey S. Size and Characteristics of the Unauthorized Migrant Population in the U.S. Pew Hispanic Center. Rep. no. 61.

Demographics of New York City
Illegal immigration to the United States